Acaryochloris marina is a symbiotic species of the phylum Cyanobacteria that produces chlorophyll d, allowing it to use far-red light, at 770 nm wavelength.

Description
It was first discovered in 1993 from coastal isolates of coral in the Republic of Palau in the west Pacific Ocean and announced in 1996. Despite the claim in the 1996 Nature paper that its formal description was to be published shortly thereafter, a tentative partial description was presented in 2003 due to phylogenetic issues (deep branching cyanobacterium).

Genome
Its genome was sequenced in 2008, revealing a large bacterial genome of 8.3 Mb with nine plasmids.

Etymology
The name Acaryochloris is a combination of the Greek prefix a (ἄν) meaning "without", caryo (κάρυον) meaning "nut" (here intended as "nucleus") and chloros (χλωρός) meaning green; therefore it is new Latin Acaryochloris meaning "without nucleus green".
The specific epithet marina is Latin meaning "marine".

Classification

Due to historical reason, the classification of the Cyanobacteria is problematic and many are not validly published, meaning they have not yet been placed into the classification framework. One of these not officially recognised species is Acaryochloris marina, which technically should be written as "Acaryochloris marina" in official writings, but in effect this is rarely done (cf.)

Exoplanet habitability
Scientists including NASA's Nancy Kiang have proposed that the existence of Acaryochloris marina suggests that organisms that use chlorophyll d, rather than chlorophyll a, may be able to perform oxygenic photosynthesis on exoplanets orbiting red dwarf stars (which emit much less light than the Sun). Because about 70% of the stars in the Milky Way galaxy are red dwarfs, the existence of A. marina implies that oxygenic photosynthesis may be occurring on far more exoplanets than astrobiologists initially thought possible.

See also
 Prochlorococcus

References

Synechococcales
Environmental microbiology
Bacteria described in 2003